Luciano Doria (born 1891) was an Italian screenwriter, producer and film director.

Selected filmography
Red Love (1921)
 Pleasure Train (1924)
 Beatrice Cenci (1926)
 The Golden Vein (1928)
 Goodbye Youth (1928)
 Kif Tebbi (1928)
 For Men Only (1938)
 The Fornaretto of Venice (1939)
 We Were Seven Sisters (1939)
 The Carnival of Venice (1939)
 Rossini (1942)
 The Opium Den (1947)
 The Loves of Hercules (1960)

References

Bibliography
 Goble, Alan. The Complete Index to Literary Sources in Film. Walter de Gruyter, 1999.

External links

1891 births
Year of death unknown
Italian film directors
Italian film producers
Italian screenwriters
Film people from Rome